This is a list of educational and research institutions in Visakhapatnam, India.

Universities and Central Institutions 

 Andhra University
 Indian Institute of Management
 Indian Institute of Petroleum and Energy
 Damodaram Sanjivayya National Law University
 Indian Maritime University
 Kalam Institute of Health Technology
 National Institute of Oceanography, India
 GITAM University

Medical Colleges 

 Andhra Medical College
 GITAM Institute of Medical Sciences and Research
 NRI Institute of Medical Sciences
 Gayatri Vidya Parishad Institute of Healthcare & Medical Technology

Engineering Colleges 
Andhra University College of Engineering (Autonomous)
Andhra University College of Engineering for Women
 Gayatri Vidya Parishad College of Engineering
 Anil Neerukonda Institute of Technology and Sciences
 Vignan's Institute of Information Technology
 Raghu Engineering College
 Visakha Institute of Engineering & Technology
 Avanthi Institute of Engineering & Technology
 Nadimpalli Satyanarayana Raju Institute Of Technology
 Dr. Lankapalli Bullayya College of Engineering
 Vizag Institute of Technology
 Sanketika Vidya Parishad Engineering College
 Chaitanya Engineering College
 VITAM  Engineering College

Degree Colleges 
 Mrs. A. V. N. College
 Dr. V. S. Krishna Govt. Degree & P.G College
 Dr. Lankapalli Bullayya College
 Visakha Govt. Degree College For Women
 St.Joseph's College For Women
 Gayatri Vidya Parishad College for Degree and PG Courses
 Aditya Degree College
 PRISM Degree and PG College
 M.V.R Degree College
 TSR and TBK Degree College
 Samata College
 VINEX DEGREE COLLEGE

Polytechnic Colleges 

 Government Polytechnic College, Visakhapatnam
 Government Institute of Chemical Engineering, Visakhapatnam
 Government Polytechnic College for Women, Bheemunipatnam
 Government Polytechnic College, Pendurthi
 Government Polytechnic College, Anakapalli
 Mrs. A.V.N Polytechnic College
 Sanketika Polytechnic College
 Sai Ganapathi Polytechnic College
 Alwardas Polytechnic College
 Avanthi Polytechnic College
 Behara Polytechnic College

Schools

 Ameya World School
 Bethany School
 D.A.V. Public School
 Delhi Public School
 De Paul School
 Greendale International School
 Kendriya Vidyalaya
 Kotak Salesian School
 Pollocks High School
 Little Angels School
 Navy Children School
 Oakridge International School
 S.F.S. High School
 Silver Oaks International School
 Sri Prakash Vidyaniketan
 Sri Sathya Sai Vidya Vihar
 St Aloysius' Anglo-Indian High School
 St. Joseph's Secondary School
 Timpany School

References

Education in Visakhapatnam
Universities and colleges in Visakhapatnam
Organisations based in Visakhapatnam
Visakhapatnam
educational institutions in Visakhapatnam
Visakhapatnam